Peter Vaughan (born Peter Ewart Ohm; 4 April 1923 – 6 December 2016) was an English character actor known for many supporting roles in British film and television productions. He also acted extensively on the stage.

He is perhaps best known for his role as Grouty in the sitcom Porridge and its 1979 film adaptation. Other parts included a recurring role alongside Robert Lindsay in the sitcom Citizen Smith, Tom Hedden in Straw Dogs, Winston the Ogre in Time Bandits, Tom Franklin in Chancer and Mr. Stevens, Sr. in The Remains of the Day. His final role was as Maester Aemon in HBO's Game of Thrones (2011–2015).

Early life
Vaughan was born Peter Ewart Ohm on 4 April 1923 in Wem, Shropshire, the son of a bank clerk, Max Ohm, who was an Austrian immigrant, and Eva Wright, a nurse. The family later moved to Wellington, in the same county, where he began his schooling. Vaughan said that while reciting a poem at infant school in Wellington he first experienced the applause and admiration coming from a good performance. From the age of seven he lived in Staffordshire, where he attended Uttoxeter Grammar School.

After leaving school, Vaughan joined the Wolverhampton Repertory Theatre, and gained experience in other repertory theatres as well, before army service during the Second World War. He was commissioned a second lieutenant in the Royal Corps of Signals on 9 June 1943, and served in Normandy, Belgium, and the Far East. At the end of the war, Vaughan was in Singapore during the liberation of Changi Prison.

Career

Vaughan made his film debut in 1959 in an uncredited role as a police officer in The 39 Steps. He continued for several years to play small parts, including more cameos as policemen in Village of the Damned and The Victors, before gaining his first starring role, in a minor picture called Smokescreen (1964), where he played an insurance assessor investigating a businessman's disappearance in one of the last, and best, of the old-style British B-movies. In 1967, he received second billing opposite Frank Sinatra in the film The Naked Runner. His performance was not well received by one critic who accused him of overacting in his role as a British agent. He played Mr. Freeman in Karel Reisz's 1980 The French Lieutenant's Woman, alongside Meryl Streep and Jeremy Irons.

Possibly Vaughan's highest-profile film performance was as the father of Anthony Hopkins's character in The Remains of the Day (1993). He was also cast in Terry Gilliam's The Man Who Killed Don Quixote, but had not shot any material before that project was abandoned. He had previously appeared for Gilliam in Time Bandits and Brazil. Vaughan appeared as a menacing character in Straw Dogs (1971), and with Bill Murray in a film of W. Somerset Maugham's novel The Razor's Edge in 1984. In 1996, he appeared as Giles Corey in The Crucible, and in 1997 he appeared alongside Robert Carlyle and Ray Winstone in Face. In 1998, Vaughan played Bishop Myriel in Les Misérables, alongside Liam Neeson. His most unusual role may have been as SS Obergruppenführer Arthur Nebe in the 1994 film of Robert Harris's novel Fatherland.

He appeared in the music video for Kate Bush's song "Experiment IV".

Television
Vaughan became known for his performances on television, including supporting roles in Porridge (as "Genial" Harry Grout) and Citizen Smith as Charles Johnson (his role in the latter series was taken over by Tony Steedman). His role in Porridge brought him a great deal of public recognition despite his character appearing in only three episodes and in the 1979 film of the series.
In 1975, he appeared as Tony Kirby in an episode of the hard hitting police drama The Sweeney entitled Stay Lucky, Eh?

He also appeared as "The Fence" in the well known humorous advert for McVities Fruit Shortcake biscuits along with Harry Fowler.

In 1969, Vaughan appeared in Randall and Hopkirk in the episode "Never Trust a Ghost". In the same year, he starred in the thirteen-part London Weekend Television TV series The Gold Robbers. In December 1972, he appeared as Mr. Paxton in the BBC television adaptation of the M.R. James ghost story in A Warning to the Curious, shown as part of their annual series A Ghost Story for Christmas.' In September 1973, he appeared as Quinn in the London Weekend Television TV series The Protectors, in an episode called 'Quinn'.

Vaughan starred as Billy Fox in the Thames Television series Fox (1980). The saga was written by Trevor Preston, directed by Jim Goddard, and produced by Verity Lambert. Other Fox family members were played by Elizabeth Spriggs, Ray Winstone, Larry Lamb, and Bernard Hill. Historical roles Vaughan played include those of Russian foreign minister Alexander Izvolsky in the serial Fall of Eagles (1974), British politician Thomas Inskip in the mini-series Winston Churchill: The Wilderness Years (1981), the title role in A Last Visitor for Mr. Hugh Peter (1981), and German Nazi figures Kurt Zeitzler in the miniseries War and Remembrance (1988) and Hermann Göring in the Granada Television-PBS docu-drama Countdown to War (1989). He also appeared in many literary adaptations, such as Bleak House (BBC, 1985), in which he played the sinister lawyer Mr. Tulkinghorn, and Our Mutual Friend (BBC Two, 1998). Other television work includes the espionage thriller Codename: Kyril (1988), in a lead role as the head of the KGB.

In 1986, Vaughan appeared in the promotional video for Kate Bush's "Experiment IV" single. In 1991, he played John Turner in an episode of Granada Television's The Adventures of Sherlock Holmes titled '"The Boscombe Valley Mystery".

He also appeared in the BBC production of Alan Aykbourn's play 'Season's Greetings' which was broadcast at Christmas 1986, and repeated on BBC 2 some years later.  He played the role of Uncle Harvey.

Vaughan later attained particular acclaim for his supporting role as the Alzheimer's sufferer Felix Hutchinson in Our Friends in the North (BBC Two, 1996), a role that garnered a Best Actor nomination at the 1997 British Academy Television Awards. He played the clockmaker George Graham in Longitude, the TV drama adaptation of Dava Sobel's eponymous non-fiction novel about the quest for a means to determine longitude at sea.
In 2007 he starred in the television series Mobile, and as Uncle Alfie in the film Death at a Funeral.
In 2011 Vaughan starred as Michael Dodd in the BBC courtroom drama Silk. His final role, between 2011 and 2015, was Maester Aemon in the HBO series Game of Thrones.

Radio
Vaughan was heard as Superintendent Kirk in the BBC dramatisation of Dorothy L. Sayers' Peter Wimsey novel Busman's Honeymoon, and as Denethor in the 1981 BBC Radio production of The Lord of the Rings. He played Charles Augustus Milverton in a 1993 BBC radio dramatization of the Sherlock Holmes short story.

Stage 
Vaughan's first breakthrough role was in 1964 as Ed in Joe Orton's work Entertaining Mr Sloane performed at Wyndham's Theatre.

Personal life and death
The first of Vaughan's two marriages was to Billie Whitelaw, whom he married in 1952 and divorced in 1966. His second wife was actress Lilias Walker, with whom he lived in the village of Mannings Heath, in West Sussex, until his death, having previously lived in Crawley. His stepdaughter Victoria Burton (actress and producer) is married to Gregor Fisher.

Vaughan was partially blind in his old age. On 6 December 2016, he died peacefully of natural causes at the age of 93.

Filmography
Vaughan appeared in the following films and television series:

 The 39 Steps (1959) as 2nd Police Constable on Train (uncredited)
 Sapphire (1959) as Detective Whitehead (uncredited)
 Village of the Damned (1960) as P.C. Gobby
 Make Mine Mink (1960) as Policeman in Car (uncredited)
 Deadline Midnight (1960–1961, TV series) as Joe Dunn
 Two Living, One Dead (1961) as John Kester
 The Court Martial of Major Keller (1961) as Purvey
 I Thank a Fool (1962) as Police Inspector
 The Devil's Agent (1962) as Chief of Hungarian Police
 Oliver Twist (1962 TV series) as Bill Sikes
 The Punch and Judy Man (1963) as Committee Man
 The Victors (1963) as Policeman
 Smokescreen (1964) as Roper
 Fanatic (1965) as Harry
 Rotten to the Core (1965) as Sir Henry Capell
 The Naked Runner (1967) as Martin Slattery
 The Man Outside (1967) as Nikolai Volkov
 Great Expectations (1967, TV series)  as Mr. Jaggers
 The Bofors Gun (1968) as Sgt. Walker
 Hammerhead (1968) as Hammerhead
 A Twist of Sand (1968) as Johann
 Alfred the Great (1969) as Burrud
 Taste of Excitement (1970) as Inspector Malling
 Eyewitness (1970) as Paul Grazzini
 Straw Dogs (1971) as Tom Hedden
 The Rivals of Sherlock Holmes (1971, TV series) as Horace Dorrington
 The Pied Piper (1972) as Bishop
 Savage Messiah (1972) as Museum Attendant
 A Warning to the Curious (1972) as Mr. Paxton
 The Return (1973) as Steven Royds
 The Blockhouse (1973) as Aufret
 The MacKintosh Man (1973) as Brunskill
 Malachi's Cove (1973) as Mr. Gunliffe
 Massacre in Rome (1973) as Gen. Albert Kesselring
 Symptoms (1974) as Brady
 11 Harrowhouse (1974) as Coglin
 Intimate Reflections (1975) as Saleman
 Valentino (1977) as Rory O'Neil
 The Doombolt Chase (1978, TV miniseries) as Captain Hatfield
 Zulu Dawn (1979) as Q.S.M. Bloomfield
 Porridge (1979) as Harry Grout
 The Danedyke Mystery (1979, TV series) as Det. Insp. Burroughs
 Fox (1980, TV series) as Billy Fox
 Time Bandits (1981) as Winston the Ogre
 The French Lieutenant's Woman (1981) as Mr. Freeman
 Coming Out of the Ice (1982) as Belov
 The Razor's Edge (1984) as Mackenzie
 Forbidden (1984) as Major Stauffel
 Brazil (1985) as Mr. Helpmann
 Sins (1986, TV miniseries) as Chief Prosecutor
 Monte Carlo (1986, TV miniseries) as Pabst
 Haunted Honeymoon (1986) as Francis Abbot, Sr.
 Coast to Coast (1987) as The Chiropodist
 Countdown to War (1989) as Hermann Göring
 Mountains of the Moon (1990) as Lord Houghton
 King of the Wind (1990) as Captain
 Prisoner of Honor (1991) as Gen. Mercier
 The Boscombe Valley Mystery, The Case-Book of Sherlock Holmes (1991) as John Turner
 Lovejoy (1992) as Marek (episode "The Prague Sun")
 Nightingales (1993) as William Stevens
 The Remains of the Day (1993) as William Stevens
 Dandelion Dead (1994) as Doctor Hinks
 Rab C. Nesbitt (1994) (UK TV series) as Brother Adam (episode "Buckfast")
 Fatherland (1994) as Nebe
 The Secret Agent (1996) as The Driver
 The Crucible (1996) as Giles Corey
 Our Friends in the North (1996) as Felix Hutchinson
 The Moonstone (1997) as Gabriel Betterege
 Face (1997) as Sonny
 Our Mutual Friend (1998, TV miniseries) as Mr. Boffin
 Les misérables (1998) as the Bishop
 The Legend of 1900 (1998) as 'Pops', the Shopkeeper
 The Good Son (1998) as Mick Doyle
 An Ideal Husband (1999) as Phipps
 Horatio Hornblower: The Wrong War (1999, TV movie) as Admiral Lord Hood
 Canone inverso – Making Love (2000) as Old Baron Blau
 Longitude (2000) as George Graham
 The 10th Kingdom (2000) as Wilfred Peep
 The Thing About Vince (2000) as Ray Skinner
 Hotel Splendide (2000) as Morton Blanche
 Second Sight (2000, TV series) as Harold King (guest appearance, episode Kingdom of the Blind)
 Lorna Doone (2000) as Sir Ensor Doone
 Kiss Kiss (Bang Bang) (2001) as Daddy Zoo
 Heartbeat (2002, TV series) as Arthur Wainwright
 The Jury (2002, TV series) as Michael Colchester
 Casualty (2003, TV series) as Henry Lambert
 The Mother (2003) as Toots
 Thursday the 12th (2003, TV movie) as Edgar Bannister
 Margery and Gladys (2003, TV movie) as Troy Gladwell
 Sweet Medicine (2003, TV series) as Laurence Barber
 Life Beyond the Box: Norman Stanley Fletcher (2003, TV movie) as Harry Grout
 The Life and Death of Peter Sellers (2004) as Bill Sellers
 Beauty (2004, TV movie) as Mr. Robbins
 The Queen of Sheba's Pearls (2004) as Edward Pretty
 Malice Aforethought (2005, TV movie) as Widdicombe
 Heartbeat (2005, TV series) as Mr. Andrews
 Care (2006, short) as Archie
 Death at a Funeral (2007) as Uncle Alfie
 Mobile (2007, TV miniseries) as Grandad Stoan
 Christmas at the Riviera (2007, TV movie) as Glen
 Lark Rise to Candleford (2008, TV series) as Reverend Ellison
 HolbyBlue (2008, TV series) as Clarence
 Is Anybody There? (2008) as Bob
 The Antiques Rogue Show (2009, TV movie) as George Greenhalgh
 Doc Martin (2011, TV series) as William Newcross (guest appearance)
 Silk (2011, TV series) as Michael Dodd (guest appearance)
 Albatross (2011) as Grandpa
 Game of Thrones'' (2011–2015, TV series) as Maester Aemon (11 episodes; recurring) (final role)

References

External links

 
 Obituary: Peter Vaughan from BBC News

1923 births
2016 deaths
People from Wem
Actors from Shropshire
British Army personnel of World War II
English male film actors
English male stage actors
English male television actors
English people of Austrian descent
20th-century English male actors
21st-century English male actors
Royal Corps of Signals officers